Will Sanders is an Australian cricketer. On 7 January 2022, Sanders was added to the Hobart Hurricanes squad for the 2021-22 Big Bash League season as a COVID-19 replacement. He made his Twenty20 debut for the Hobart Hurricanes on 8 January 2022.

References

External links
 

Living people
Australian cricketers
Hobart Hurricanes cricketers
Date of birth missing (living people)
Place of birth missing (living people)
Year of birth missing (living people)